Anil Manibhai Naik (born 9 June 1942) is an Indian industrialist, philanthropist and the Group Chairman of Larsen & Toubro Limited, an Indian engineering conglomerate, and since 2018, the Chairman of the National Skill Development Corporation.

He was awarded the Padma Bhushan, India's 3rd highest civilian award, in 2009. In 2019, he was awarded the Padma Vibhushan, India's 2nd highest civilian award. Naik is also the recipient of the 'Economic Times - Business Leader of the Year Award, for the year 2008.

Early life 

Naik is a Gujarati. He was born to a family of teachers in Gujarat, also referred to as Master Kutumb in Gujarati language. His father, who used to teach at Hansraj Morarji Public School in Mumbai, heeded Mahatma Gandhi’s call to revitalise India's villages, and decided to return to his native village along with his family. Young Anil had finished five years at his father's school by this time, and the rest of his schooling was obtained from schools in Endhal and the neighbouring village of Kharel. In June 1958, Naik enrolled at V.P. Science College in Vallabh Vidyanagar, where he would prepare for a year for admission to an engineering college.

He graduated with a bachelor's degree in mechanical engineering from Birla Vishvakarma Mahavidyalaya Engineering college in Vallabh Vidyanagar in Gujarat.

After graduation, he went to Mumbai with a note from his father introducing him to Viren J. Shah (another HMPS alumnus) working in Mukand Iron & Steel Works Limited to apply for its engineering programme. Due to his lack of proficiency in English, the personnel manager had asked him to improve his English. So Naik started working on his English skills. In the meantime, he joined Nestor Boilers, which was a Parsi-owned firm. Changes in ownership and management style at Nestor Boilers prompted Naik to turn to L&T.

Career at L&T 
On 15 March 1965, Naik joined L&T, as a junior engineer.  A rapid rise followed. He was appointed Assistant Manager within three years and 15 days of joining – a record at L&T.  He was promoted as General Manager in 1986. He became Member of board of L&T Limited on 23 November 1989.  In 1999, he took over as the Chief Executive Officer and Managing Director. In 2003, he became the Chairman of Larsen & Toubro, the first employee in the Company's history to be elevated to this post. At the helm, Naik initiated the transformation process that made L&T into a more entrepreneurial organisation with increased emphasis on wealth creation for all stakeholders. In an interview to McKinsey, Naik explained his reasons for the portfolio rationalisation that he undertook. In 2017, he stepped aside from executive responsibilities, and took over as Group Chairman.

Ring fencing L&T 
In the late 1980s, L&T encountered a take over attempt as a large business group seized substantial stake in the company.  Matters came to a head in 2002, when the group's entire holding was transferred en bloc to yet another family-owned business house.  The way in which Naik thwarted the take-over and fortified L&T against such threats has been widely covered in the media. It ended in a ‘win-win’, with all parties concerned being happy with the outcome. S. Gurumurthy, currently on the Board of the Reserve Bank of India described the events as a ‘security threat for L&T being converted into a security ring.’ The Employee Stock Options which emanated from the successful resolution of the issue gave financial security to a large section of employees, and allowed them to share in the Company's growth.

Shaping L&T into a ‘Nation Builder’ 
Naik's stewardship of L&T is characterised by a sharper focus on sectors of national significance - defence, nuclear, aerospace, infrastructure, oil & gas and power. He has been instrumental in imparting a strong, nationalistic orientation to the Company's products, offerings and capabilities, giving rise to its description as ‘the company that is building 21st Century India’.

Chairman – NSDC 
In 2018, the Government of India appointed Naik the Chairman of the National Skill Development Corporation – the apex body to promote skilling and part of the Skill India mission of the Prime Minister. Making the announcement, Skill Development and Entrepreneurship Minister Dharmendra Pradhan said under Naik's leadership, the corporation apart from its engagement in executing skilling modules, should also be a think-tank providing direction and necessary guidance for creating a demand-based skilling ecosystem in the country. Naik said NSDC has developed a unique model combining skill development with strong industry partnerships. NSDC, under the ministry, aims to promote skill development by catalysing creation of large, quality and for-profit vocational institutions. The organisation provides funding to build scalable and profitable vocational training initiatives.

Philanthropy 
In August 2016, Naik announced that he would give 75% of his income to charitable causes over his lifetime, setting up the Naik Charitable Trust for education and the Nirali Memorial Medical Trust for healthcare.

Nirali Memorial Medical Trust had entered into an agreement to set up a Cancer Hospital at Navsari which will be operated by Tata Trusts. In January 2019, the Prime Minister of India laid the foundation stone for the Cancer hospital in Navsari, Gujarat. The healthcare campus at Navsari will also house a speciality hospital for which the NMMT has tied up with the Apollo Hospitals Group. NMMT also runs Nirali Memorial Radiation Centre in nearby Surat, a multi-disciplinary hospital at Powai in Mumbai and provides modern medical facilities at a hospital at Kharel, Gujarat.

Awards and honours 

 Honorary Consul General for Denmark.
 Senior member of the Confederation of Indian Industry.
 Member of the Board of Trade, Ministry of Commerce, Government of India.
 Fellow of the Indian National Academy of Engineers.
 Former Member of the Board of Governors of the Indian Institute of Management, Ahmedabad.
 Nominated as the Chairman of the IIMA (IIM Ahmedabad) Society and the Board of Governors, for a period of three years starting 28 March 2012
Conferred ‘Doctor of Letters’ (Honoris Causa) by the Sardar Patel University on 15 December 2011
 Conferred Doctor of Philosophy from Gujarat Technological University on 19 January 2013
Conferred Doctor of Letters from Veer Narmad University of South Gujarat on 26 February 2016
Conferred Doctor of Science from Maharaja Sayajirao University of Baroda in December 2016
Ranked India’s Most Generous Corporate Professional by Hurun India and Edelgive Foundation - 2021

Personal life 
A.M. Naik is married to Geeta Naik. They have two children, both based in the USA: a son, Jignesh, who works for Google and a daughter, Pratiksha, who runs a private medical practice.

Bibliography
‘The Nationalist – How A.M. Naik Transformed L&T into a Global Powerhouse’,  by Minhaz Merchant and published by Harper Collins.

'Strategic Brand Management for B2B Markets: A Road Map for Organizational Transformation', by Sharad Sarin and published by SAGE Publications India Pvt Ltd.

'The Art of Business Leadership : Indian experiences', by S Balasubramanian and published by Response Books.

References

External links
 Interview of AM Naik, Feb 2012
 Interview of AM Naik, Feb 2014

1942 births
Living people
Indian chief executives
Recipients of the Padma Bhushan in trade and industry
Place of birth missing (living people)
Knights of the Order of the Dannebrog
Gujarati people
Businesspeople from Gujarat
Engineers from Gujarat
Recipients of the Padma Vibhushan in trade & industry
Larsen & Toubro